Willowwood Arboretum, is an arboretum and public park located at 300 Longview Road, Chester Township, New Jersey, Morris County, New Jersey. It is part of the Morris County Park System and is open to the public daily.

The location was first cleared for farming in the 18th century, which led to the formation of the meadows that now exist on the property. It was originally named Paradise Farm before being bought by amateur arborist brothers, Henry and Robert Tubbs, in 1908, who then renamed the property Willowwood after the natural collection of willow trees that exist in the area. They expanded the farmhouse that dates back to 1792 and made it into their family home. The brothers slowly collected and grew many specimens over the next half century, including a vast collection of rare and exotic species, thanks in part to the popular New York horticultural scene at the dawn of the 20th century. Afterward, the property was formed into a private arboretum and run by Rutgers University as a plant and tree research facility. It then became part of the Morris County Park System in 1980.

The arboretum consists of both wild forest and tended tree collections, farm land, a residence with two small gardens and a handful of smaller out-buildings. There are about 3,500 types of native and exotic plants, many rare.

Both wild and cultivated plantings can be seen on self-guiding tours through informal paths in open areas and woodlands.

Gallery

See also 
 Bamboo Brook Outdoor Education Center – adjoining park
 List of botanical gardens and arboretums in New Jersey

References

External links

 
Willowwood Foundation

Arboreta in New Jersey
Botanical gardens in New Jersey
Parks in Morris County, New Jersey
County parks in New Jersey